Sandra Andersen Eira (born 21 June 1986) is a fisher and Norwegian Sámi politician from Russenes, Porsanger, Finnmark, Norway. As of 2022, she is serving as a medic, while an enlistee in the Ukrainian Armed Forces. 

From 2017 to 2021, she served as a member of the Sámi Parliament of Norway (Sametinget), elected to the Norwegian Sámi Association from the Ávjovárri constituency.

Following the end of her term in the Sametinget, she spent a year commuting between the United States and Norway, including expanding her fishing business and being featured in a documentary titled Sea Sisters. During the 2022 Russian invasion of Ukraine, she volunteered for the International Legion of Territorial Defense of Ukraine, joining a mixed-British and American ranger squad; she worked as a medic on the squad; as of December 2022, she is still part of the armed struggle in Ukraine; she has been back to Norway [at least] one time, for a few days.

References

External links
 Sandra Andersen Eira at Sametinget

1986 births
Living people
People from Porsanger
Members of the Sámi Parliament of Norway
Norwegian Sámi politicians
21st-century Norwegian women politicians
21st-century Norwegian politicians
People of the Russo-Ukrainian War
International Legion of Territorial Defense of Ukraine personnel
Ukrainian female military personnel
Women in 21st-century warfare
Norwegian fishers
Foreign volunteers in the 2022 Russian invasion of Ukraine